= Coral stone =

Coral stone may refer to:

- Calcium carbonate, secreted by corals
- "Coral shaped stone" or staghorn stone, a form of kidney stone
